The Very Best of Cream is a 1995 compilation album by the British rock band Cream.

Track listing

Personnel
Ginger Baker – drums, percussion, vocals
Jack Bruce – bass guitar, acoustic guitar, piano, organ, harmonica, cello, vocals
Eric Clapton – guitar, vocals

Charts

Certifications

References

Cream (band) compilation albums
1995 greatest hits albums
Polydor Records compilation albums